That's My Work 3 is a mixtape by American rapper Snoop Dogg, hosted by DJ Drama. It was released free for digital download on February 27, 2014 and includes 20 songs. It is the third mixtape in the That's My Work series.

Track listing

References 

2014 mixtape albums
Snoop Dogg albums
Albums produced by 1500 or Nothin'
Albums produced by Nottz
Albums produced by Rick Rock
Albums produced by Mr. Porter
Albums produced by Scott Storch